Song Ju-Seok (송주석, born. February 26, 1967) is a former South Korean footballer.

He played for only one club in the K-League, Ulsan Hyundai Horang-i. In K-League 1990, his first season, he was named K-League Rookie of the Year, beating his strong rivals including Kim Hyun-Seok and Ha Seok-Ju. He scored 3 goals and made 7 assists in K-League 1990.

Club career statistics

External links
 
 

1967 births
Living people
Association football forwards
South Korean footballers
South Korea international footballers
Ulsan Hyundai FC players
K League 1 players
Yeosan Song clan
People from Gangneung